AASS or Aass may refer to:

 Alpha-aminoadipic semialdehyde synthase
 American Anti-Slavery Society abolitionist society in existence from 1833 to 1870
 Aass Brewery, Norway's oldest active brewery
 Th. Valentin Aass (1887–1961), Norwegian sailor and civil servant

See also
 Aas (disambiguation)